The year 1713 in music involved some significant events.

Events 
Foundation of the Académie Royale de Danse by King Louis XIV of France.
Daniel Purcell becomes organist at St Andrew's Church, Holborn, London.
Francesco Bartolomeo Conti becomes court composer to the Habsburgs in Vienna.
Giuseppe Tartini claims to have had a dream in which he allows the devil to play his violin.
Antonio Stradivari makes the Gibson Stradivarius.

Publications
Giuseppe Matteo Alberti – 10 Violin Concertos, Op. 1
Francesco Antonio Bonporti – Invenzioni a violino solo, Op. 10 (Italian edition). Venice-Trento: Giovanni Parone.
Johann Heinrich Buttstett  
Musicalische Clavier-Kunst und Vorraths-Kammer
Praeludium & Capricio
Louis-Nicolas Clérambault – Cantates françoises, Book 2 (inc. Léandre et Héro, Alphée et Aréthuse, Pirame et Tisbé and Pigmalion)
François Couperin – Pièces de clavecin, book 1
William Croft – Musicus Apparatus Academicus
Louis-Antoine Dornel – Sonates en Trio, Op. 3
Johann Mattheson – Das neu-eröffnete Orchestre (Hamburg: Mattheson)
 Jean-Féry Rebel – 12 Violin Sonatas
 Johann Christian Schieferdecker – XII. Musicalische Concerte, bestehend aus etlichen Ouverturen und Suiten

Classical music 
Johann Sebastian Bach 
Gleichwie der Regen und Schnee vom Himmel fällt, BWV 18
Ich hatte viel Bekümmernis, BWV 21
Der Friede sei mit dir, BWV 158
Ich lasse dich nicht BWV Anh. 159
Was mir behagt, ist nur die muntre Jagd, BWV 208
Organ Concerto in A minor, BWV 593
Organ Concerto in C major, BWV 594
Organ Concerto in C major, BWV 595 (based on Johann Ernst Prinz von Sachsen-Weimar Op.1)
Organ Concerto in D minor, BWV 596
Herr Christ, der einge Gottessohn, BWV 601
Puer natus in Bethlehem, BWV 603
Der Tag, der ist so freudenreich, BWV 605
Vom Himmel hoch, da komm ich her, BWV 606
In dulci jubilo, BWV 608
Jesu, meine Freude, BWV 610
Helft mir Gottes Güte preisen, BWV 613
Prelude in C minor, BWV 921
16 Konzerte nach verschiedenen Meistern, BWV 972–987
Trio Sonata in F major, BWV 1040
Canon in A minor, BWV 1073
Alles mit Gott und nichts ohn' ihn, BWV 1127
 Antonio Caldara – Oratorio di S. Stefano, primo re dell'Ungheria
Christoph Graupner 
Wie bald hast du gelitten, GWV 1109/14
Ich bin zwar Asch und Kot, GWV 1135/13
Was Gott tut das ist wohlgetan, GWV 1153/13
George Frideric Handel
Ode for the Birthday of Queen Anne, HWV 74
Utrecht Te Deum and Jubilate
As Pants the Hart, HWV 251a
 Elisabeth Jacquet de la Guerre – La Musette, ou les Bergers de Suresne
 James Paisible – The Pastorall. Mr. Isaac's new dance, made for Her Majesty's Birth Day, 1713...
 Antonio Vivaldi – Beatus vir, RV 598

Opera
Francesco Feo – L'amor tirannico, ossia Zenobia
George Frideric Handel 
Teseo, HWV 9, Premiered January 10 in London
Silla, HWV 10
Nicola Porpora – Basilio re d'oriente
Antonio Vivaldi 
Orlando furioso
Ottone in villa, RV 729

Births 
January 7 – Giovanni Battista Locatelli, opera director (1785)
February 13 – Domènech Terradellas, composer (died 1751)
March – Giammaria Ortes, Venetian composer and polymath (d. 1790)
March 12 – Johann Adolph Hass, clavichord and harpsichord maker (died 1771)
April 7 – Nicola Sala, composer and music theorist (died 1801)
April 13 – Pierre Jélyotte, operatic tenor (died 1797)
October 3 – Antoine Dauvergne, violinist and composer (died 1797)
October 13 – Johann Ludwig Krebs, composer (died 1780)
October 24 – Marie Fel, opera singer (died 1794)
December 10 – Johann Nicolaus Mempel, musician (died 1747)
date unknown
Johan Henrik Freithoff, violinist and composer (died 1767)
Johannes Erasmus Iversen, composer (died 1755)
probable – Robert Bremner, music publisher (died 1789)

Deaths 
January 8 – Arcangelo Corelli, composer and violinist (born 1653)
March 26 – Paul I, 1st Prince Esterházy of Galántha, composer
March 30 – Govert Bidloo, opera librettist (born 1649)
April 14 – Marcus Fronius, theologian, poet and musician (born 1659)
October 28 – Paolo Lorenzani, composer (born 1640)
October 31 – Ferdinando de' Medici, Grand Prince of Tuscany, patron of music (born 1663)
date unknown – Ludovico Roncalli, composer for guitar (born 1654)
probable – Stanisław Sylwester Szarzyński, composer

 
18th century in music
Music by year